Harald Johan Løbak (2 June 1904 –  6 February 1985) was a Norwegian politician for the Labour Party.

He was born in Trysil.

He was elected to the Norwegian Parliament from Hedmark in 1945, and was re-elected on six occasions.

He was the Minister of Agriculture from May 1956 to April 1960 during the third cabinet Gerhardsen. During the period, he was replaced in the Norwegian Parliament by Haldis Tjernsberg.

On the local level, he was a member of Trysil municipality council from 1928 to 1955, serving as mayor from 1937 except for the period 1940–1945 during the German occupation of Norway. He chaired the county party chapter from 1952 to 1968.

References

1904 births
1985 deaths
Ministers of Agriculture and Food of Norway
Mayors of places in Hedmark
Members of the Storting
Labour Party (Norway) politicians
20th-century Norwegian politicians
People from Trysil